"Ryda" is a song by American rapper The Game featuring American rapper DeJ Loaf, produced by Canadian music producers Mikhail and Pops. It was released as a single on April 23, 2015.

Music video
On May 4, 2015 Game uploaded the music video for "Ryda" on his VEVO channel. Directed by Benny Boom, the video is inspired by Bonnie and Clyde, with both Loaf and Game committing an armored truck robbery by gunpoint and exploding said truck after taking all the money.

Track listing
Digital download
"Ryda" (Explicit)  – 3:29

Charts

Release history

References

External links
 

2015 singles
2015 songs
Dej Loaf songs
The Game (rapper) songs
Music videos directed by Benny Boom